Brothers of Italy (Italian: Fratelli d'Italia) is a 1952  Italian biographical war film directed by Fausto Saraceni and starring Ettore Manni, Paul Muller and Olga Solbelli. It depicts real life events of  Austrian-born Italian irredentist and sailor Nazario Sauro. The film's sets were designed by the art director Piero Filippone.

Cast 
 Ettore Manni as Il capitano Nazario Sauro
 Olga Solbelli as 	Anna Sauro
 Paul Muller as 	Luigi Staffi
 Mario Ferrari as 	Comandante nave italiana
 Ennio Girolami as Sergio
 Carlo Hintermann as Tenente Sarnich
 Fanny Landini as 	Nina
 Lili Cerasoli as 	Maria Sauro 
 Nino Marchetti as 	Comandante del sommergibile Pullino
 Mario Feliciani as Cesare Battisti
 Marc Lawrence as Il capitano March
 Riccardo Garrone as 	Dazé

References

Bibliography 
 Chiti, Roberto & Poppi, Roberto. Dizionario del cinema italiano: Dal 1945 al 1959. Gremese Editore, 1991.

External links

1952 films
Italian biographical films
Italian war films
World War I naval films
Biographical films about military leaders
Films set in the Mediterranean Sea
1950s biographical films
Italian black-and-white films
1950s Italian films
1950s Italian-language films
Minerva Film films